The Daniel and Catherine Christian House, located in Eugene, Oregon, is a house listed on the National Register of Historic Places. Constructed , the house is the oldest residential structure in Eugene and one of six remaining classical revival houses in Lane County.

Daniel Christian was among the early settlers in the Eugene area. In 1853 he built a log cabin on his Donation Land Claim, and in 1855 he built the subject house at the edge of what became the Christian Addition on early maps of downtown Eugene.

See also
 National Register of Historic Places listings in Lane County, Oregon

References

1855 establishments in Oregon Territory
Houses completed in 1855
Houses on the National Register of Historic Places in Eugene, Oregon
Neoclassical architecture in Oregon